The 1917 Washington State football team represented Washington State College in the 1917 college football season, its first in the Pacific Coast Conference. Home games were played on campus at Rogers Field in Pullman, Washington.

Washington State defeated in-state rival Washington for the first time in a decade.

Schedule

References

External links
 Game program: 362nd Infantry vs. Washington State at Tacoma – October 13, 1917
 Game program: Whitman at Washington State – October 27, 1917
 Game program: Washington State at Idaho – November 3, 1917
 Game program: Washington State at Washington – November 29, 1917

Washington State
Washington State Cougars football seasons
Pac-12 Conference football champion seasons
College football undefeated seasons
Washington State football